Sabaton is a power metal band from Falun, Sweden. As of 2022 they have released ten studio albums, including Carolus Rex, which was recorded in separate Swedish and English versions, certified gold in Poland and platinum in Sweden with 40,000 album sales, making it the "most successful Swedish heavy metal album ever" according to the band.

Albums

Studio albums

Live albums

Video albums

Compilation albums

Extended plays

Singles

Notes

Other charted songs

Music videos

References

External links

 Official Sabaton website

Heavy metal group discographies
Discographies of Swedish artists